The 1975 Syracuse Orangemen football team represented Syracuse University during the 1975 NCAA Division I football season. The team was led by second-year head coach Frank Maloney and played their home games at Archbold Stadium in Syracuse, New York. The team finished with a record of 6–5 and were not invited to a bowl game.

Schedule

Roster

References

Syracuse
Syracuse Orange football seasons
Syracuse Orangemen football